The Journal of Women's History is a quarterly peer-reviewed academic journal established in 1989 covering women's history. It explores multiple perspectives of feminism rather than promoting a single unifying form. Articles published in this journal showcase the dynamic international field of women’s history. The JWH features cutting-edge scholarship from around the globe in all historical periods. Publication in the JWH is a mark of scholarly distinction. It offers clear evidence of a scholar’s ability to ask and answer compelling questions of general interest. It is published by the Johns Hopkins University Press. The editors-in-chief from June 2020 are Sandie Holguín and Jennifer J. Davis (University of Oklahoma). 

According to the Journal Citation Reports, the journal has a 2015 impact factor of 0.127, ranking it 39th out of 40 journals in the category "Women's Studies".

See also 
 List of women's studies journals

References

External links 
 

Women's history
History journals
Feminism and history
Publications established in 1989
Quarterly journals
Johns Hopkins University Press academic journals
English-language journals
Women's studies journals